Agononida emphereia is a species of squat lobster in the family Munididae. The species name is derived from the Latin word empheria, meaning "likeness," which is in reference to how similar it is to closely related species.

References

Squat lobsters
Crustaceans described in 1997